= Nandu Ram =

Indian sociologist and retired professor

- Born: India
- Died: 13 July 2025 (aged 78)

Academic work
- Discipline: Sociologist
- Institutions: Jawaharlal Nehru University

Nandu Ram was an Indian sociologist and retired professor. He was the former dean of school of social sciences at the Jawaharlal Nehru University, New Delhi, and was one of the founding professors of the Dr. Ambedkar Chair in Sociology at JNU.

== Books ==
Ram had published more than three dozen research articles and was the author of three books. His major works are as follows:

- The Mobile Scheduled Castes: Rise of a New Middle Class (1988)
- Beyond Ambedkar: Essays on Dalits in India (1995)
- Ambedkar, Dalits and Buddhism, (ed.) Manak Publications, Delhi, 2008, Nandu Ram, CSSS.
- Dalits in Contemporary India, (ed.) Siddhant Publications, New Delhi, 2008, Nandu Ram, CSSS.
- Caste System and Untouchability in South India, Manak Publications, Delhi, 2008, Nandu Ram, CSSS.
- Encyclopedia of Scheduled Castes in India : In 5 Volumes.
